Davide Martinelli (born 31 May 1993) is an Italian professional road bicycle racer, who currently rides for UCI WorldTeam .

Career
Martinelli made his debut in an  jersey in the 2016 Tour Down Under. On 24 February 2016, he scored a surprise first professional win in stage 2 of the Tour La Provence. He was the lead out man for Fernando Gaviria in the finale, but a crash split the peloton which allowed a chance for him to cross the line ahead of Gaviria. His maiden UCI World Tour win came on 12 July 2016 in the first stage of the Tour de Pologne. He attacked within the final kilometre, taking the victory ahead of Gaviria.

He was named in the start list for the 2017 Giro d'Italia.

Personal life
Davide Martinelli is the son of former Italian cyclist and  director sportif Giuseppe Martinelli.

Major results

2011
 1st  Individual pursuit, National Track Championships
 1st  Time trial, National Junior Road Championships
 1st Trofeo Emilio Paganessi
 1st Memorial Davide Fardelli Juniors
 3rd GP dell'Arno
 3rd Trofeo Buffoni
 6th Time trial, UEC European Junior Road Championships
 7th Overall GP Denmark
2012
 1st Coppa del Grano
 2nd Time trial, National Under-23 Road Championships
 3rd Circuito del Porto
 3rd Piccolo Giro dell'Emilia
 4th La Popolarissima
2013
 1st  Time trial, National Under-23 Road Championships
 1st Coppa 1.º de Maggio
 2nd G.P. Sportivi di Podenzano
 Coppa Mobilio Ponsacco
2nd Time trial
2nd Road race
 2nd Memorial Lorenzo Mola
 3rd Circuito del Porto
 3rd Giro della Valcavasia
 3rd GP Mocambo Bar
 5th GP Sovizzo
 6th Time trial, Mediterranean Games
 9th Chrono Champenois
2014
 1st  Time trial, National Under-23 Road Championships
 1st Prova-Bracciale del Cronoman
 1st Bracciale del Cronoman
 1st Trofeo Mario Zanchi
 1st  Points classification Tour de l'Avenir
 2nd  Time trial, UEC European Under-23 Road Championships
 2nd Milano–Busseto
 2nd Bracciale del Cronoman
 3rd Memorial Angelo Fumagalli
 3rd Firenze–Mare
 6th Circuito del Porto
 6th Medaglia d'Oro Domenico e Anita Colleoni
 7th Chrono Champenois
 9th Trofeo Edil C
2015
 1st  Time trial, National Under-23 Road Championships
 1st Fucecchio (La Torre)
 UEC European Under-23 Road Championships
3rd  Road race
7th Time trial
 3rd Gran Premio Industrie del Marmo
 3rd Chrono Champenois
 5th Coppa della Pace
 6th GP Laguna
 6th Paris–Roubaix Espoirs
 8th Gran Premio della Costa Etruschi
2016
 1st Stage 1 Tour de Pologne
 1st Stage 2 Tour La Provence
 4th GP Briek Schotte
 5th Overall Ster ZLM Toer
 7th Down Under Classic
2017
 10th Handzame Classic
 10th Brussels Cycling Classic
 10th Grote Prijs Jef Scherens
2018
 1st Stage 1 (TTT) Adriatica Ionica Race
2019
 3rd  Team relay, UEC European Road Championships
 9th Heistse Pijl

Grand Tour general classification results timeline

References

External links

1993 births
Living people
Cyclists from Brescia
Italian male cyclists
Competitors at the 2013 Mediterranean Games
Mediterranean Games competitors for Italy